Sturla Þórðarson (29 July 1214–30 July 1284) was an Icelandic chieftain and writer of sagas and contemporary history during the 13th century.

Biography
The life of Sturla Þórðarson  was chronicled in the Sturlunga saga. 
Sturla was the son of Icelandic chieftain Þórður Sturluson and his mistress Þóra, and grandson of Sturla Þórðarson the elder. He was a nephew and pupil of the famous saga-writer Snorri Sturluson. His brother was Icelandic skald and scholar Ólafur Þórðarson hvítaskáld. 

He fought alongside Þórður kakali Sighvatsson during the Age of the Sturlungs. Sturla was appointed law speaker over all of Iceland for a brief period after the dissolution of the Icelandic Commonwealth, and wrote the law book Járnsíða.

Like his uncle, Snorri, and his brother, Óláfr, Sturla was a prolific poet. He is reported in Sturlu þáttr as telling a saga called Huldar saga. He is best known for writing Íslendinga saga, the longest saga within Sturlunga saga, and Hákonar saga Hákonarsonar, the story of Haakon IV of Norway. He also wrote a saga of Haakon's son, Magnus the lawmender (Magnúss saga lagabœtis), of which only fragments have survived. Some scholars also believe him to have written Kristni saga and Sturlubók, a transcript of Landnáma. He is moreover listed in Skáldatal as the court skald of the Swedish ruler Birger Jarl.

References

Other sources
 Jón Viðar Sigurðsson; Sverrir Jakobsson (2017) Sturla Þórðarson: Skald, Chieftain and Lawman (Boston: Brill)

External links 
 
 

1214 births
1284 deaths
Icelandic writers
Sturlungar family clan
13th-century writers
Scandinavian folklore
Lawspeakers
13th-century Icelandic people
Goðar